Belluscone: A Sicilian Story is a 2014 Italian docu-fiction film written and directed by Franco Maresco. It was screened in the Horizons section at the 71st Venice International Film Festival, winning the Special Jury Prize.

Cast 

Salvatore De Castro: himself
Ciccio Mira: himself
Vittorio Ricciardi: himself
Marcello Dell'Utri:himself
 Ficarra e Picone: themselves 
Tatti Sanguineti: himself
Vittorio Sgarbi: himself

References

External links

2014 films
Italian documentary films
2014 documentary films
Docufiction films
Films set in Sicily
Films about the Sicilian Mafia
Cultural depictions of Silvio Berlusconi
2010s Italian films